This article lists events that occurred during 1944 in Estonia.

Incumbents
Nikolai Karotamm - First Secretary of the Communist Party of Estonia

Events
Otto Tief was captured by Soviet forces; Jüri Uluots and members of the Tief government escaped to Sweden.
30 January – Battle of Narva: The first Soviet units crossed Estonian border.
24 February – Battle of Narva: Estonian volunteers launched a counterattack at Narva river.
6 March – World War II: Soviet Army planes attack Narva in Estonia, destroying almost the entire old town.
9 March – World War II: Soviet Army planes attack Tallinn, Estonia.
26 July – Battle of Narva: The Soviets captured Narva.
29 July – Battle of Tannenberg Line: The Estonian and German counterattack stopped Soviet advance towards Tallinn.
26 August – The Soviets captured most of Tartu, what became frontline city for almost a month.
September – although German troops were expelled from Estonia, the local anti-Soviet movement (so called Forest Brothers) organized small-scaled armed resistance against Soviet regime.
18 September – Jüri Uluots, prime minister in capacity of president of Estonia, asks Otto Tief to form a government on the eve of the withdrawal of German forces; official gazette published proclaiming the Tief government.
20 September – Otto Tief attempts to organise the defence of Tallinn against the arrival of the Red Army two days later.
22 September – The Soviets captured Tallinn.
19 December – The entire territory of Estonia was captured by the Red Army.

Births
26 January – Helle-Reet Helenurm, actress (died 2003)
3 July – Viiu Härm, actress
10 October – Lii Tedre, actress

Deaths
August 26 Hans Leesment, Estonian general (b. 1873)
November 22 Johan Pitka, Estonian entrepreneur, sea captain and admiral (b. 1872)

References

 
1940s in Estonia
Estonia
Estonia
Years of the 20th century in Estonia